El Enemigo  (English:The Enemy) is a Mexican telenovela produced by Ernesto Alonso and transmitted by Telesistema Mexicano.

Luz María Aguilar and Augusto Benedico starred as protagonists.

Cast
Luz María Aguilar
Augusto Benedico
Anita Blanch
Manuel Calvo
Kippy Casado
Mari Carmen González
Rafael Banquells
Armando Arriola
Mario García González
Pastora Peña

See also
El Enemigo (1979 telenovela), a remake

References

1961 Mexican television series debuts
1961 telenovelas
Mexican telenovelas
Televisa telenovelas
Spanish-language telenovelas